Tormo is a surname. Notable people with the surname include: 
Cristina García-Orcoyen Tormo (born 1948), Spanish politician and environmentalist
Elías Tormo (1869–1957), Spanish art historian
Ricardo Tormo (1952–1998), Spanish motorcycle road racer
Sara Sorribes Tormo (born 1996), Spanish tennis player

See also
Tordo
Tormod